William Slocum Groesbeck (July 24, 1815 – July 7, 1897) was an American lawyer and politician who served one term as a U.S. Representative from Ohio from 1857 to 1859.

Early life
Groesbeck was born in Kinderhook, New York on July 24, 1815.  He was the son of John H. Groesbeck (1790–1862) and Mary (née Slocum) Groesbeck (1794–1854). The Groesbeck family was originally from Amsterdam. William's sister, Margaret Groesbeck, was married to his wife's brother, Robert Wallace Burnet.

Groesbeck moved with his parents to Cincinnati, Ohio in 1816.  He attended the common schools and Augusta College in Kentucky.  He was graduated from Miami University, Oxford, Ohio, in 1835 and was responsible for founding the Miami University chapter of Alpha Delta Phi, the first fraternity chapter west of the Allegheny Mountains.

Career
He studied law and was a law clerk in the office of Salmon P. Chase (later the Governor of Ohio and Secretary of the Treasury during the Lincoln administration).  He was admitted to the bar in 1836 and commenced practice in Cincinnati, Ohio.

In 1851, he served as member of the State constitutional convention and, in 1852, he served as commissioner to codify the laws of Ohio. Groesbeck was elected to succeed John Scott Harrison as a Democrat to the Thirty-fifth Congress, serving one term from March 4, 1857 to March 3, 1859.  He was an unsuccessful candidate against John A. Gurley for reelection in 1858 to the Thirty-sixth Congress.

He served as member of the Peace Convention of 1861 held in Washington, D.C., in an effort to devise means to prevent the impending war.  From 1862 to 1864, he served in the Ohio State Senate and in 1866, he served as delegate to the Union National Convention at Philadelphia.

He was one of U.S. President Andrew Johnson's counsel in his impeachment trial in 1868.

In 1872, he was nominated for president of the United States by Liberal Republicans who were displeased with Horace Greeley, but his ticket was forgotten during the excitement of the campaign, at the end of which he received one electoral vote for vice-president.
He served as delegate to the International Monetary Conference in Paris, France, in 1878.

Personal life
Groesbeck married Elizabeth Burnet (1818–1889), daughter of Judge Jacob Burnet. Together, they were the parents of:

 Mary Groesbeck (1838–1852), who died in childhood.
 Rebecca Burnet Groesbeck (1840–1914), who married Robert Hale Ives Goddard.
 Elizabeth Burnet Groesbeck, who married Kenelm Henry Digby.
 Jacob Burnet Groesbeck (1842–1858), who died in childhood.
 William John Groesbeck (1844–1845), who died in infancy.
 Caroline Thew Groesbeck (1849–1863), who died in childhood.
 Herman John Groesbeck (1849–1925), who married Elizabeth Perry (1850–1924), daughter of Judge Aaron F. Perry.
 Julia Groesbeck (1854–1919), who married Robert Ludlow Fowler (1849–1936) in 1876.
 Telford Groesbeck (1854–1936), who married Louise Bulkeley Cox (1854–1940).

His wife died on April 6, 1889, leaving five living children.  Groesbeck died in Cincinnati, Ohio on July 7, 1897 and was interred in Spring Grove Cemetery.

References

External links
 
 
 
 

1815 births
1897 deaths
People from Kinderhook, New York
Burials at Spring Grove Cemetery
Miami University alumni
Ohio Constitutional Convention (1850)
Ohio lawyers
Ohio state senators
Politicians from Cincinnati
Members of the defense counsel for the impeachment trial of Andrew Johnson
American people of Dutch descent
Democratic Party members of the United States House of Representatives from Ohio
19th-century American politicians
Ohio Liberal Republicans